Young Man with a Horn is a 1950 American musical drama film starring Kirk Douglas, Lauren Bacall, Doris Day, Hoagy Carmichael, and Juano Hernandez. Directed by Michael Curtiz, it was based on the 1938 novel of the same name by Dorothy Baker inspired by the life of jazz cornetist Bix Beiderbecke.  The film was produced by Jerry Wald, and its screenplay written by Carl Foreman and Edmund H. North.

Plot
Rick Martin is a young Midwestern orphan cared for by an indifferent elder sister, living in his own isolated world.  He is first drawn to an inner-city mission for alcoholics and its piano-accompanied hymns.  Seeking a more portable instrument, his eye catches a trumpet in the window of a pawn shop. He works as a pin setter in a bowling alley to save up enough money to buy it. Tutored by Black jazzman Art Hazzard (Juano Hernandez) Rick grows into an outstanding, intuitive jazz musician (played by Kirk Douglas). He lands a job playing for a large dance band, getting to know piano player Willy "Smoke" Willoughby (Hoagy Carmichael) and beautiful featured singer Jo Jordan (Doris Day). In spite of being ordered to stick to the song arrangements, Rick prefers to improvise, and one night during a band break he leads an impromptu jam session, which gets him fired.

Rick and Smoke leave together, but go separate ways.  Some time later Jo and Rick discover one-another in New York City.  She falls for him again, and finds him a job in New York with a dance orchestra. One night her friend Amy North (Lauren Bacall) accompanies her to hear Rick play. A wealthy dilettante studying to be a psychiatrist, Amy is a complicated young woman still disturbed by her own mother's suicide, which she blames on her father. Though she claims to be incapable of feeling love, and warns Rick away, he persists in questing for her, so completely he begins to neglect his old friends. Always concerned with his welfare, Jo eventually tries to open his eyes to Amy and the harm she will do him; overhearing, Amy stuns her by telling her that she and Rick have already married.

Amy does not enjoy Rick's music and is not interested in his career, focusing on her own psychiatry studies. Rarely together because of their opposite schedules, they begin to quarrel and Amy sometimes does not even come home at night. Badly rattled by all this, Rick begins drinking. Art finds him in a bar and tries gently to offer advice and help. Overwrought with his own problems, Rick takes his frustrations out on his visibly failing, soon to be unemployed, friend. In a fog after Rick's treatment, Art wanders out of the bar and straight into the path of a car. By the time Rick learns of it and can rush to the hospital Art is dead.

Returning home Rick finds Amy torturing a piano concerto after failing her final exams.  They immediately quarrel.  The idea of trying school again is clearly less attractive to her than going to Paris with a new girlfriend to dabble at becoming a painter. She admits to Rick that she only married him because she hoped that some of his grounding in his own talent would rub off on her.  Having returned to being a cold fish towards him, she rejects his attempts at comfort. The next night Rick goes to Art's funeral instead of attending a cocktail party Amy throws.  He arrives home just as guests are leaving; she is drunk and angry at him for embarrassing her in front of her circle by not showing up. They argue viciously, then she introduces him to her new girlfriend.  He tells Amy she is sick and should see a doctor, and leaves her.

Unable to keep his fury pent up, and disgust at allowing himself to be stultified playing in a dance band, he immediately gets fired, then neglects even his own music. Broken, he descends deeper into the bottle. At a recording session with Smoke and Jo he plays erratically and loses control of his instrument trying to reach a magic note he has dreamed of. He destroys his horn and drops out of sight, wandering around as a common rummy. One night he collapses in the street and a cab driver takes him to a sanitarium. It turns out he has pneumonia and is in danger of dying.  Smoke has him transferred to a hospital, where he can be treated for both. Jo hurries to his side and helps him recover his health.  He does, rediscovers his music, and finally is able to return her love.

Cast

 Kirk Douglas as Rick Martin
 Lauren Bacall as Amy North
 Doris Day as Jo Jordan
 Hoagy Carmichael as Willie 'Smoke' Willoughby
 Juano Hernández as Art Hazzard
 Jerome Cowan as Phil Morrison
 Mary Beth Hughes as Marge Martin
 Nestor Paiva as Louis Galba
 Walter Reed as Jack Chandler

Production
Composer-pianist Hoagy Carmichael, a friend of the real Bix Beiderbecke, added realism to the film as Rick's sidekick and gave Kirk Douglas an insight into playing the role. Famed Big Band trumpeter Harry James dubbed Douglas' playing in a Swing Era soloist's style.

In her authorized biography Doris Day described her experience making the film as "utterly joyless", particularly working with Douglas. According to her, Douglas aspersed her ever-cheerful persona as only a "mask" that had kept him from ever being able to get to know the real person underneath. She countered that while Douglas had been "civil", he was too self-centered to make any real attempt to get to know either her or anyone else.

In the Baker novel, Amy is described as having lesbian tendencies; the film employs period Hollywood connotations and hints to circumvent the Motion Picture Production Code and strongly imply her bisexuality. For example, regarding Jo, Amy says: "It must be wonderful to wake up in the morning and know just which door you’re going to walk through. She’s so terribly normal."  Later, Amy, who has already come to refusing Rick's physical advances, dismisses their future together by telling him she may leave for France with a new girlfriend to study art, whom she later shares an affectionate goodnight with in front of her already fuming husband.

The tacked-on happy ending of the film was found neither in the novel nor in the life of Bix Beiderbecke, who died of alcoholism at 28.

Reception
According to the contemporary The New York Times, "banalities of the script are quite effectively glossed over in the slick pictorial smoothness of Michael Curtiz's direction and the exciting quality of the score. The result is that there is considerable good entertainment in Young Man With a Horn despite the production's lack of balance."

In spite of the screenplay, the Times praised the performances of Douglas, Day, and Carmichael, but noted "the unseen star of the picture is Harry James, the old maestro himself, who supplies the tingling music, which flows wildly, searchingly, and forlornly from Rick Martin's beloved horn. This is an instance where the soundtrack is more than a complementary force. It is the very soul of the picture because if it were less provocative and compelling, the staleness of the drama could be stultifying."

Radio adaptation
Young Man with a Horn was presented on Lux Radio Theatre March 3, 1952. Kirk Douglas recreated his role from the film. The one-hour adaptation also starred Jo Stafford and Patrice Wymore.

See also
 List of American films of 1950

References

External links

 
 
 
 
 

1950 films
1950s musical drama films
1950s biographical films
American musical drama films
Films based on American novels
American biographical drama films
Biographical films about musicians
1950s English-language films
American black-and-white films
Films based on biographies
Jazz films
Films directed by Michael Curtiz
Films scored by Ray Heindorf
Films with screenplays by Carl Foreman
Films adapted into radio programs
Cultural depictions of jazz musicians
Films about alcoholism
Films à clef
1950 drama films
1950s American films